Kyubyainde (Kübeyiŋde) is a rural locality (a selo), the only inhabited locality, and the administrative center of Yugyulyatsky Rural Okrug of Vilyuysky District in the Sakha Republic, Russia, located  from Vilyuysk, the administrative center of the district. Its population as of the 2010 Census was 619, of whom 324 were male and 295 female, up from 600 as recorded during the 2002 Census.

References

Notes

Sources
Official website of the Sakha Republic. Registry of the Administrative-Territorial Divisions of the Sakha Republic. Vilyuysky District. 

Rural localities in Vilyuysky District